Alexander Montgomerie (c. 1550–1598) was a Scottish Jacobean courtier and poet

Alexander Montgomerie may also refer to:

Alexander Montgomerie, 1st Lord Montgomerie (died 1470)
Alexander Montgomerie, 6th Earl of Eglinton (1588–1661)
Alexander Montgomerie, 9th Earl of Eglinton (c. 1660–1729), Scottish peer
Alexander Montgomerie, 10th Earl of Eglinton (1723–1769), son of the above
  For any of the Earls of Eglinton named Alexander Montgomerie see Earl of Eglinton
Alexander Montgomerie Bell (1806–1866), Scottish writer on law

See also
Alexander Montgomery (disambiguation)